The Vibrisseaceae are a family of fungi in the order Helotiales. The family was circumscribed by mycologist Richard Korf in 1990 to include the genera Vibrissea, Chlorovibrissea, and Leucovibrissea. According to the Dictionary of the Fungi (10th edition, 2008), the family encompasses 5 genera and 59 species.

Description

Members of the Vibrisseaceae have filiform (threadlike) to cylindrical ascospores.

References

Helotiales
Ascomycota families
Taxa named by Richard P. Korf
Taxa described in 1990